Aboubacar Sidiki "Titi" Camara (born 17 November 1972) is a Guinean former professional footballer who played as a striker. He was also the coach of the Guinean national team, which he captained and played for. He was also the Guinea sports minister, before being replaced in October 2012. He is best known for his stint with Liverpool in the 1999–2000 season, where he scored 10 goals in 37 games in all competitions, memorably scoring the winner in a game against Arsenal at Highbury.

Club career

Early career
Camara played for Saint-Étienne, Lens and Marseille in France, (playing in the 1999 UEFA Cup Final for the latter) before being transferred to Liverpool.

Liverpool
A cult hero and crowd favourite at Anfield, Camara is best remembered for playing at Anfield against West Ham in October 1999, the morning after the death of his father, scoring the winning goal and then dropping to his knees in front of the Anfield Road stand with tears flowing.
He also managed to score in three successive Premier League games for the Reds in late autumn of 1999. On 13 February, he scored the winner at Highbury, leading Liverpool to a 1–0 win over Arsenal.
Despite his short spell at Liverpool, he was voted in 91st position in the 2006 poll "100 Players Who Shook The Kop", which was conducted by the official Liverpool Football Club web site. Camara's placing made him the second highest placed African player, behind Bruce Grobbelaar.

West Ham United
Signed by manager Harry Redknapp on 21 December 2000 for a fee of £1.5 million which, depending on other factors, could have risen to £2.6 million, Camara announced, "I've come to West Ham to play, play, play – and score, score, score. If it was a question of money, I could have stayed at Liverpool and picked it up. I need to play, and if I don't it is totally pointless." Making his West Ham debut on 23 December 2000 in a 2–1 away defeat to Leicester City, Camara went on to play only fourteen games, in all competitions, without scoring at all.

Al-Ittihad
In January 2003 Camara was sent out on loan to Al-Ittihad for the remainder of the 2002–03 season.

Al-Siliya
Following West Ham's relegation in 2003 from the Premier League Camara left the club for Al-Siliya
after his contract was terminated by mutual consent.

International career
Titi Camara was a stalwart of the Guinea team from the early 1990s until the early 2000s. He is regarded as a key protagonist in Guinea's return to respectability in African football and played for his country at the 2004 African Nations Cup, where he scored 3 goals in the Group Stage, which meant he finished just one goal behind the leading scores of the tournament.

Coaching career
In December 2005, he was linked with the vacant manager's job with the Guinea national team. On 13 May 2009, Captain Moussa Dadis Camara, the President of Guinea publicly announced that he wanted him to manage the national team. At the end of May 2009, Camara was named the National Technical Director (NTC). On 9 June 2009, Camara was named the head coach of the Syli National to succeed Robert Nouzaret. Camara was serving in dual capacities of NTC and head coach of the Syli National. On 15 September 2009, three months following his nomination as head coach of the Syli National, Camara was replaced by Mamadi Souaré, a former Captain of the Syli National, following poor results, lack of cooperation/understanding with certain conspicuous members of the Guinean Football Federation (FGF), and absence of "cordial" relations with certain key elements of the Syli National.

Breach of contract
In September 2003, alleging breach of contract, Camara sued West Ham United. In 2006, West Ham successfully defended the High Court breach of contract claim brought by Camara.

Minister of Sports
On 28 December 2010, Camara was made Sports Minister of Guinea by newly elected president Alpha Condé, making him the country's first ex-sportsman to hold a government post. He was forced out of his post on 5 October 2012 in a government reshuffle.

References

External links

Thisisanfield.com Forgotten Hero
Player profile at Liverpool FC
 LFChistory.net player profile

1972 births
Living people
Sportspeople from Conakry
Association football forwards
Guinean footballers
Guinean expatriate footballers
Guinea international footballers
1994 African Cup of Nations players
1998 African Cup of Nations players
2004 African Cup of Nations players
AS Saint-Étienne players
RC Lens players
Expatriate footballers in France
Expatriate footballers in England
Olympique de Marseille players
Ligue 1 players
Liverpool F.C. players
West Ham United F.C. players
Ittihad FC players
Amiens SC players
Premier League players
Al-Sailiya SC players
Guinean football managers
Guinea national football team managers
Sports ministers of Guinea
Saudi Professional League players
Qatar Stars League players